Tetsuya Yamano (Shinjitai: 山野 哲也, born 2 October 1965, in Tokyo) is a Japanese  racing driver.

Complete JGTC/Super GT Results

References 

1965 births
Living people
Japanese racing drivers